Victoria Island is an island in the Sacramento-San Joaquin River Delta,  southwest of Stockton. The  island is bounded on the north by North Victoria Canal, on the northeast by Middle River, on the southeast by Victoria Canal, and on the south- and southwest Old River. It is crossed by California State Route 4. It is in San Joaquin County, and managed by Reclamation District 2040. It appears on 1913 and 1952 United States Geological Survey maps of the area.

Buried impact structure

Oil exploration led to the discovery of a possible buried impact structure in the sediments under the island.  It was named the Victoria Island Structure after the island.

See also
List of islands of California

References

Islands of the Sacramento–San Joaquin River Delta
Islands of Northern California
Islands of San Joaquin County, California
Islands of California